Lasse Midttun (born 1960) is a Norwegian journalist in the weekly newspaper Morgenbladet. He does book reviews and literary critiques.

Publications
Veien til vestfronten. Essays fra en reise, 2002

References

1960 births
Living people
Norwegian journalists
Norwegian literary critics
Morgenbladet people